Monika Jančová (born 19 March 1992) is a Czech slalom canoeist who has competed at the international level since 2011.

She won three medals in the C1 team event at the ICF Canoe Slalom World Championships with two silvers (2013, 2015) and a bronze (2017). She also won two silvers and a bronze in the same event at the European Championships.

World Cup individual podiums

References

External links

Czech female canoeists
Living people
1992 births
Medalists at the ICF Canoe Slalom World Championships